Hindaun is a city and municipality, near city of Karauli in Karauli district, Rajasthan, India. It  has a population of 105690 and is governed by a municipal council.

In the vicinity are the Aravalli and Vindhya mountainous ranges.

History 
In the ancient time Hindaun came under the Matsya kingdom. There are many ancient structures still present in the town built during the regime of Matsya Kingdom. Traditionally in some mythological stories the town is believed to be associated with the mythology of Hiranyakashipu and Prahlada mentioned in Bhagavata Purana.

Hindaun is named after the name of ancient ruler king Hiranyakashipu, father of Prahlada. The temple to Narasimha, an Avatar of Hindu God Vishnu who killed Hiranyakashipu, along with the historic Prahalad Kund (now in dilapidated condition) demonstrates the town's connection to the mythology surrounding Hiranyakashipu and Prahlada.

During the start of April 2018, Hinduan was subjected to curfew in response to caste-related violence.

Location 
Hindaun is located in the eastern part of Rajasthan, (a north-western state in India) in the vicinity of the Aravalli Range.

The town is well connected with Jaipur, Agra, Alwar, Dholpur, Bharatpur with modernized roads.

Its distance from the state capital of Jaipur is around 150 km.

Industries 
The city is known for its sandstone industry. The Red Fort, Akshardham Temple of Delhi, and Ambedkar Park are made of this sandstone. The slate industry is well rooted here and is important in the state. Slate is transported abroad also. Various small-scale industries, e.g. candle, battis, wooden toys, and plastic water pipes, also exist.

Tourist attractions

The main places of attraction in Hindaun City are: The Prahladkund, forest, Hiranyakashayap ka kua, palace and the Narsinghji Temple, Shri Mahavirji Temple is a major pilgrimage center in Jainism. The Jaggar Dam of Jagar, Kundeva, Danghati, the Suroth Fort, City of Moradwaja, the castle of Garmora and Padampura, the Timangarh fort, Sagar Lake, Dhruv Ghata and the well of Nand-Bhaujai are some popular attractions. The temples of goddess Chamunda Mata Temple, Chinayata and Chamunda Mata Temple, Sankarghanta in western part of city, Nakkash Ki Devi - Gomti Dham (the heart temple of Hindaun City) with adjacent sacred pond termed as Jalsen pond. Radha-Raman Ji Temple and Shri Hardev Ji Temple are also famous and located within the city.

List of Attractions

Dargah of Sufi Saint Shaikh Abdur-Rehmaan Chishti is also at Hadoli. The shrine has the grave (Maqbara) of the revered saint, Shaikh Abdur - Rehmaan Chisti nephew of greatest sufi saint of India Moinuddin Chishti in Ajmer, Rajasthan.

As per provisional reports of Census India the population of Hindaun in 2011 was 105,690; of which male and female are 49,541 and 56,149 respectively. The sex ratio of Hindaun is 881 per 1000 males.

As per the census, the total number literates in the city is 105,690 of which 56,149 are males and 49,541 are females. Average literacy rate of Hindaun is 76.58 percent of which male and female literacy was 87.79 and 63.94 percent.

Total children (aged 0–6) in Hindaun are 45,451 as per figure from Census India report on 2011. There were 25,345 boys and 20,106 are girls. Child sex ratio of girls is 852 per 1000 boys.

Climate 

Temperature in summer ranges between 25 and 45 degrees Celsius and in winter it is between 2 and 23 degrees Celsius.

Agriculture 
The land of the area is fertile and the crop rotation is commenced by the ryots. The central agriculture yard is located at Kyarda village opposite to 220kv power house. The major crops are wheat, millet, maize, mustard, cluster bean, ground nut, gooseberry, lemon potato, gram, barley. The monsoon, Jagar damand canal, wells and underground water are the source of irrigation. The seasonal vegetables and fruits are also sown by peasants.

Education 

The city is famous for its Industrial Training Institutes. There are Teacher Training Institutes. Almost all district topper in RBSE Exams are from Hindaun City.

Transportation

Roads 
NH 47 (Indian National Highway No. 47) links Delhi To Mohana, MP by Delhi-Haryana-Rajasthan-Madhya Pradesh is announced by the central government in March 2016.

City transportation 

Shared auto are operated between roadways bus stand and railway station. People use buses and auto-rickshaws to reach nearby places.

Railway 

Hindaun City is a station on the New Delhi–Mumbai main line. Other railway stations in proximity to the city are Shri Mahabirji, Fateh Singhpura and Sikroda Meena[dhindhorahukmikheda]

Airport 
Nearest major airport is Jaipur International Airport, that is 160 km from the city-centre, and offers sporadic service to major domestic and international locations.

See also
Gavda Meena

References 

 
Cities and towns in Karauli district